Tarot card reading is a form of cartomancy whereby practitioners use tarot cards to purportedly gain insight into the past, present or future. They formulate a question, then draw cards to interpret them for this end. A traditional tarot deck consists of 78 cards, which can be split into two groups, the Major Arcana and Minor Arcana. French-suited playing cards can also be used; as can any card system with suits assigned to identifiable elements (e.g., air, earth, fire, water).

History

The first written references to tarot packs occurred between 1440 and 1450 in northern Italy, for example in Milan and Ferrara, when additional cards with allegorical illustrations were added to the common four-suit pack. These new packs were called carte da trionfi, triumph packs, and the additional cards known simply as trionfi, which became "trumps" in English.

One of the earliest references to tarot triumphs is given c. 1450–1470 by a Dominican preacher in a sermon against dice, playing cards and 'triumphs'. References to the tarot as a social plague or indeed as exempt from the bans that affected other games, continue throughout the 16th and 17th centuries, but there are no indications that the cards were used for anything but games. As philosopher and tarot historian Michael Dummett noted, "it was only in the 1780s, when the practice of fortune-telling with regular playing cards had been well established for at least two decades, that anyone began to use the tarot pack for cartomancy."

Claims by the early French occultists that tarot cards had esoteric links to ancient Egypt, the Kabbalah, Indic Tantra, or the I Ching have been frequently repeated by authors on card divination. However, scholarly research reveals that, having been invented in Italy in the early 15th century for playing games, there is no evidence of any significant use of tarot cards for divination until the late 18th century. In fact, historians have described western views of the Tarot pack as "the subject of the most successful propaganda campaign ever launched... An entire false history and false interpretation of the Tarot pack was concocted by the occultists; and it is all but universally believed".

The belief in the divinatory meaning of the cards is closely associated with a belief in their occult properties, a commonly held belief in early modern Europe propagated by prominent Protestant Christian clerics and Freemasons. One of them was Court de Gébelin (see below).

From its uptake as an instrument of divination in 18th-century France, the tarot went on to be used in hermeneutic, magical, mystical, semiotic, and psychological practices. It was used by Romani people when telling fortunes, as a Jungian psychological apparatus capable of tapping into "absolute knowledge in the unconscious", a tool for archetypal analysis, and even a tool for facilitating the Jungian process of individuation.

Court de Gébelin 
Many involved in occult and divinatory practices attempt to trace the tarot to ancient Egypt, divine hermetic wisdom, and the mysteries of Isis.

Possibly the first of those was Antoine Court de Gébelin, a French clergyman, who wrote that after seeing a group of women playing cards he had the idea that tarot was not merely a game of cards but was in fact of ancient Egyptian origin, of mystical Qabalistic import, and of deep divine significance. Court de Gébelin published a dissertation on the origins of the symbolism in the tarot in volume VIII of work Le Monde primitif in 1781. He thought the tarot represented ancient Egyptian Theology, including Isis, Osiris and Typhon. For example, he thought the card he knew as the Papesse and known in occult circles today as the High Priestess represented Isis. He also related four tarot cards to the four Christian Cardinal virtues: Temperance, Justice, Strength and Prudence. He relates The Tower to a Greek fable about avarice.

Although the ancient Egyptian language had not yet been deciphered, Court de Gébelin asserted the name "Tarot" came from the Egyptian words Tar, "path" or "road", and the word Ro, Ros or Rog, meaning "King" or "royal", and that the tarot literally translated to the Royal Road of Life. Subsequent research by Egyptologists found nothing in the Egyptian language to support Court de Gébelin's etymologies. Despite this lack of any evidence, the belief that the tarot cards are linked to the Egyptian Book of Thoth continues to the present day.

The actual source of the occult tarot can be traced to two articles in volume eight, one written by himself, and one written by M. le C. de M.***, who has been identified as Major General Louis-Raphaël-Lucrèce de Fayolle, Comte de Mellet. This second essay is "considerably more impressive" than de Gébelin's, albeit "as full of assertions with no basis in truth", being noted to have been even more influential than Court de Gébelin's. The author makes no acknowledgement of de Gébelin and, although he agrees with all his main conclusions, he also contradicts de Gébelin over such details as the meaning of the word "Tarot" and in how the cards spread across Europe. Morever, he takes de Gébelin's speculations even further, agreeing with him about the mystical origins of the tarot in ancient Egypt, but making several additional, and influential, statements that continue to influence mass understanding of the occult tarot even to this day. He made the first statements proposing that the tarot was "The Book of Thoth" and made the first association of tarot with cartomancy. Meanwhile Court de Gébelin was the first to imply the existence of a connection between the Tarot and "Gypsies", although this connection did not become well established in the public consciousness until other French authors such as Boiteau d'Ambly and Jean-Alexandre Vaillant began in the 1850s to promote the theory that tarot cards had been brought to Europe by the Romani. In fact, there is "virtually no evidence" that Gypsies used any form of playing card for telling fortunes until the 20th century.

Etteilla
The first to assign divinatory meanings to the tarot cards was cartomancer Jean-Baptiste Alliette (also known as Etteilla) in 1783.

According to Dummett, Etteilla:

 devised a method of tarot divination in 1783, 
 wrote a cartomantic treatise of tarot as the Book of Thoth,
 created the first society for tarot cartomancy, the Société littéraire des associés libres des interprètes du livre de Thot.
 created the first corrected tarot (supposedly fixing errors that resulted from misinterpretation and corruption through the mists of antiquity), The Grand Etteilla deck
 created the first Egyptian tarot to be used exclusively for tarot cartomancy, and
 published, under the imprint of his society, the Dictionnaire synonimique du Livre de Thot, a book that "systematically tabulated all the possible meanings which each card could bear, when upright and reversed."

Etteilla also suggested that tarot was:

 a repository of the wisdom of Hermes Trismegistus
 a book of eternal medicine
 an account of the creation of the world, and
 argued that the first copy of the tarot was imprinted on leaves of gold

In his 1980 book, The Game of Tarot, Michael Dummett suggested that Etteilla was attempting to supplant Court de Gébelin as the author of the occult tarot. Etteilla in fact claimed to have been involved with tarot longer than Court de Gébelin.

Marie Anne Lenormand
Mlle Marie-Anne Adelaide Lenormand outshone even Etteilla and was the first cartomancer to people in high places, through her claims to be the personal confidant of Empress Josephine, Napoleon and other notables. Lenormand used both regular playing cards, in particular the Piquet pack, as well as tarot cards likely derived from the Tarot de Marseille. Following her death in 1843, several different cartomantic decks were published in her name, including the Grand Jeu de Mlle Lenormand, based on the standard 52-card deck, first published in 1845, and the Petit Lenormand, a 36-card deck derived from the German game Das Spiel der Hofnung, first published around 1850.

Éliphas Lévi
The concept of the cards as a mystical key was extended by Éliphas Lévi. Lévi (whose actual name was Alphonse-Louis Constant) was educated in the seminary of Saint-Sulpice, was ordained as a deacon, but never became a priest. Michael Dummett noted that it is from Lévi's book Dogme et rituel that the "whole of the modern occultist movement stems." Lévi's magical theory was based on a concept he called the Astral Light and according to Dummett, he claimed to be the first to:

"have discovered intact and still unknown this key of all doctrines and all philosophies of the old world... without the tarot", he tells us, "the Magic of the ancients is a closed book...."

Lévi accepted Court de Gébelin's claims that the deck had an Egyptian origin, but rejected Etteilla's interpretation and rectification of the cards in favor of a reinterpretation of the Tarot de Marseille.  He called it The Book of Hermes and claimed that the tarot was antique, existed before Moses, and was in fact a universal key of erudition, philosophy, and magic that could unlock Hermetic and Qabalistic concepts. According to Lévi, "An imprisoned person with no other book than the Tarot, if he knew how to use it, could in a few years acquire universal knowledge, and would be able to speak on all subjects with unequaled learning and inexhaustible eloquence."

According to Dummett, Lévi's notable contributions included the following:

 Lévi was the first to suggest that the Magus (Bagatto) was to be depicted in conjunction with the symbols of the four suits.
 Inspired by de Gébelin, Lévi associated the Hebrew alphabet with the Major Arcana (tarot trumps) and attributed an "onomantic astrology" system to the "ancient Hebrew Qabalists."
 Lévi linked the ten numbered cards in each suit to the ten sefiroth.
 He claimed the court cards represented stages of human life.
 He also claimed the four suits represented the Tetragrammaton.

French Tarot divination after Lévi
Occultists, magicians, and magi all the way down to the 21st century have cited Lévi as a defining influence. Among the first to seemingly adopt Lévi's ideas was Jean-Baptiste Pitois.  Pitois wrote two books under the name Paul Christian that referenced the tarot, L'Homme rouge des Tuileries (1863), and later Histoire de la magie, du monde surnaturel et de la fatalité à travers les temps et les peuples (1870). In them, Pitois repeated and extended the mythology of the tarot and changed the names for the trumps and the suits (see table below for a list of Pitois's modifications to the trumps). Batons (wands) become Scepters, Swords become Blades, and Coins become Shekels.

However, it wasn't until the late 1880s that Lévi's vision of the occult tarot truly began to bear fruit, as his ideas on the occult began to be propounded by various French and English occultists.  In France, secret societies such as the French Theosophical Society (1884) and the Kabbalistic Order of the Rose-Cross (1888) served as the seeds for further developments in the occult tarot in France.

The French occultist Papus was one of the most prominent members of these societies, joining the Isis lodge of the French Theosophical Society in 1887 and becoming a founding member of the Kabbalistic Order of the Rose-Cross the next year. Among his 260 publications are two treatises on the use of tarot cards, Le Tarot des Bohémiens (1889), which attempted to formalize the method of using tarot cards in ceremonial magic first proposed by Lévi in his Clef des grands mysteries (1861), and Le Tarot divinatoire (1909), which focused on simpler divinatory uses of the cards.

Another founding member of the Kabbalistic Order of the Rose-Cross, the Marquis Stanislas de Guaita, met the amateur artist Oswald Wirth in 1887 and subsequently sponsored a production of Lévi's intended deck. Guided entirely by de Guaita, Wirth designed the first neo-occultist cartomantic deck (and first cartomantic deck not derived from Etteilla's Egyptian deck). Released in 1889 as Les 22 Arcanes du Tarot kabbalistique, it consisted of only the twenty-two major arcana and was revised under the title of Le Tarot des imagers du moyen âge in 1926.   Wirth also released a book about his revised cards which contained his own theories of the occult tarot under the same title the year following.

Outside of the Kabbalistic Order, in 1888, French magus Ély Star published Les mystères de l'horoscope which mostly repeats Christian's modifications.  Its primary contribution was the introduction of the terms 'Major Arcana' and 'Minor Arcana', and the numbering of the Crocodile (the Fool) XXII instead of 0.

The Hermetic Order of the Golden Dawn and its heirs
The late 1880s not only saw the spread of the occult tarot in France, but also its initial adoption in the English-speaking world. In 1886, Arthur Edward Waite published The Mysteries of Magic, a selection of Lévi's writings translated by Waite and the first significant treatment of the occult tarot to be published in England. However, it was only through the establishment of the Hermetic Order of the Golden Dawn in 1888 that the occult tarot was to become established as a tool in the English-speaking world.

Of the three founding members of the Golden Dawn, two, Samuel Liddell Mathers and William Wynn Westcott, published texts relating to the occult tarot prior to the founding of the order. Westcott is known to have made ink sketches of tarot trumps in or around 1886 and discussed the tarot in his treatise Tabula Bembina, sive Mensa Isiaca, published in 1887, while Mathers had published the first British work primarily focused on the tarot in his 1888 booklet entitled The Tarot: Its Occult Signification, Use in Fortune-Telling and Method of Play.

The tarot was also mentioned explicitly in the Cipher Manuscripts that served as the founding document of the Hermetic Order, both implicitly and in the form of a separate essay accompanying the manuscript. This essay was to serve as the basis for most of tarot interpretations by the Golden Dawn and its immediate successors, including such features as:

 placing The Fool before the other 21 trumps when determining the Qabalistic correspondence of the Major Arcana to the Hebrew alphabet
 attributing the Hebrew alphabet correspondences to pathways in the Tree of Life
 swapping the positions of the eighth and eleventh arcana (Justice and Strength), and
 reassigning Qabalistic planetary associations to accord with the re-ordered trumps

The Golden Dawn also:

 renamed the suits of Batons and Coins to Wands and Pentacles
 swapped the order of the King and the Knight among the court cards
 renaming them the Prince and the King, respectively
 changed the Page to become the Princess
 assigned each of the court cards, too, to the letters of the Tetragrammaton, thus associating both the court cards and suits to the four classical elements, and
 associated each of the 36 cards ranked from 2 to 10, inclusive, with one of the 36 astrological decans

The Hermetic Order never released its own tarot deck for public use, preferring instead for members to create their own copies of a deck designed by Mathers with art by his wife, Moina Mathers. However, many of these innovations would make their first public appearance in two influential tarot decks designed by members of the order: the Rider–Waite–Smith deck and the Thoth deck. In addition, occultist Israel Regardie involved himself in two separate recreations of the original Golden Dawn deck, the Golden Dawn Tarot of 1978 with art by Robert Wang, and the New Golden Dawn Ritual Tarot by Chic and Sandra Cicero, released, after Regardie's death, in 1991. The central document containing the Golden Dawn's Tarot interpretations, "Book T", was first published openly, if not under that title, by Aleister Crowley in his occult periodical The Equinox in 1912. The volume was later republished independently in 1967.

Waite and Crowley

The Rider–Waite–Smith deck, released in 1909, was the first complete cartomantic tarot deck other than those derived from Etteilla's Egyptian tarot. (Oswald Wirth's 1889 deck had only depicted the major arcana.) The deck, designed by Arthur Edward Waite, was executed by Pamela Colman Smith, a fellow Golden Dawn member, and was the first tarot deck to feature complete scenes for each of the 36 suit cards between 2 and 10 since the Sola Busca tarot of the 15th century, with designs very probably based in part on a number of photographs of them held by the British Museum.  The deck followed the Golden Dawn in its choice of suit names and in swapping the order of the trumps of Justice and Strength, but essentially preserved the traditional designations of the court cards. The deck was followed by the release of The Key to the Tarot, also by Waite, in 1910.

The Thoth deck, first released as part of Aleister Crowley's The Book of Thoth in 1944, represent a somewhat different evolution of the original Golden Dawn designs. The deck, executed by Lady Frieda Harris as a series of paintings between 1938 and 1942, owes much to Crowley's development of Thelema in the years following the dissolution of the Hermetic Order. While the deck follows Golden Dawn teachings with respect to the zodiacal associations of the major arcana and the associations of the minor arcana with the various astrological decans, it also:

 reverted to the traditional Marseille numbering of Justice and Strength as arcana 8 and 11, respectively (though it retained the swapped associations with respect to the Hebrew alphabet)
 swapped the Hebrew alphabet associations of the fourth and seventeenth arcana (The Emperor and The Star, respectively), in accordance with Crowley's Liber Legis of 1913
 renamed several of the major arcana
 renamed the suits of Batons and Coins to Wands and Disks (the latter instead of the Golden Dawn's "Pentacles"), and
 adopted the Golden Dawn's court cards, except that the Knight was not renamed

While Crowley managed to print a partial test run of the standalone deck using seven color plates included in The Book of Thoth, it was not until the 1960s, after Crowley and Harris's deaths, that the deck was first printed in its entirety.

Tarot divination in the United States
Two of the earliest publications on tarot in the English language were published in the United States, including a book by Madame Camille Le Normand entitled Fortune-Telling by Cards; or, Cartomancy Made Easy, published in 1872, and an anonymous American essay on the tarot published in The Platonist in 1885 entitled "The Taro". The latter essay is implied by Decker and Dummett to have been written by an individual with a connection to the occult order known as the Hermetic Brotherhood of Luxor. While it is not clear to what extent the Hermetic Brotherhood used tarot cards in its practices, it was to influence later occult societies such as Elbert Benjamine's Church of Light, which had tarot practices (and an accompanying deck) of its own.

Adoption of the esoteric tarot practices of the Golden Dawn in the United States was driven in part by the American occultist Paul Foster Case, whose 1920 book An Introduction to the Study of the Tarot made use of the Rider–Waite–Smith deck and assorted esoteric associations first adopted by the Golden Dawn.  By the 1930s, however, Case had formed his own occult order, the Builders of the Adytum, and began to promote the Revised New Art Tarot, by Manly P. Hall with art by J. Augustus Knapp, as well as Case's own deck.  Executed by Jessie Burns Parke, the artwork of Case's deck, the B.O.T.A. Tarot, generally resembles that of the Rider–Waite–Smith deck, but the deck also shows influences from Oswald Wirth and the original design of the Hermetic Order of the Golden Dawn tarot.  Case promoted the deck in his 1947 book The Tarot: A Key to the Wisdom of the Ages, which also marked one of the first references to the work of Carl Jung by a tarotist.

Esoteric use of the Rider–Waite–Smith Tarot was also promoted in the works of Eden Gray, whose three books on the tarot made extensive use of the deck.  Gray's books were adopted by members of the 1960s counter-culture as standard reference works on divinatory use of tarot cards, and her 1970 book A Complete Guide to the Tarot was the first work to use the metaphor of the "Fool's Journey" to explain the meanings of the major arcana.

Tarot divination since 1970

The work of Eden Gray and others in the 1960s led to an explosion of popularity in tarot card reading beginning in 1969. Stuart R. Kaplan's U.S. Games Systems, which had been founded in 1968 to import copies of the Swiss 1JJ Tarot, was well positioned to take advantage of this explosion and reissued the then out-of-print Rider–Waite–Smith Tarot in 1970, which has not gone out of print since.  Tarot card reading quickly became associated with New Age thought, signaled in part by the popularity of David Palladini's Rider–Waite–Smith-inspired Aquarian Tarot, first issued in 1968. Artists soon began to create their own interpretations of the tarot for artistic purposes rather than purely esoteric ones, such as the Mountain Dream Tarot of Bea Nettles, the first photographic tarot deck, released in 1975.

The 1980s and 1990s saw the rise of a new generation of tarotists, influenced by the writings of Eden Gray and the work of Carl Jung and Joseph Campbell on psychological archetypes.  These tarotists sought to apply tarot card reading to personal introspection and growth, and included Mary K. Greer, the author of Tarot for Your Self: A Wookbook for the Inward Journey (1984), and Rachel Pollack, the author of Seventy-Eight Degrees of Wisdom (1980/1983). Tarot cards also began to gain popularity as a divinatory tool in countries like Japan, where hundreds of new decks have been designed in recent years. The democratization of digital publishing in the 2000s and 2010s led to a new explosion of tarot decks as artists became increasingly able to self-publish their own, with the contemporaneous empowerment of feminist, LGBTQ+ and other marginalized communities providing a ready market for such work.

Use
Tarot is often used in conjunction with the study of the Hermetic Qabalah. In these decks all the cards are illustrated in accordance with Qabalistic principles, most being influenced by the Rider–Waite deck. Its images were drawn by artist Pamela Colman Smith, to the instructions of Christian mystic and occultist Arthur Edward Waite and published in 1911.
A difference from Marseilles style decks is that Waite and Smith use scenes with esoteric meanings on the suit cards. These esoteric, or divinatory meanings were derived in great part from the writings of the Hermetic Order of the Golden Dawn group, of which Waite had been a member. The meanings and many of the illustrations showed the influence of astrology as well as Qabalistic principles.

Trumps

The following is a comparison of the order and names of the Major Trumps up to and including the Rider–Waite–Smith and Crowley (Thoth) decks:

Personal use
Next to the usage of tarot cards to divine for others by professional cartomancers, tarot is also used widely as a device for seeking personal guidance and spiritual growth. Practitioners often believe tarot cards can help the individual explore one's spiritual path.

People who use the tarot for personal divination may seek insight on topics ranging widely from health or economic issues to what they believe would be best for them spiritually. Thus, the way practitioners use the cards in regard to such personal inquiries is subject to a variety of personal beliefs. For example, some tarot users may believe the cards themselves are magically providing answers, while others may believe a supernatural force or a mystical energy is guiding the cards into a layout.

Alternatively, some practitioners believe tarot cards may be utilized as a psychology tool based on their archetypal imagery, an idea often attributed to Carl Jung. Jung wrote, "It also seems as if the set of pictures in the Tarot cards were distantly descended from the archetypes of transformation, a view that has been confirmed for me in a very enlightening lecture by Professor Bernoulli." During a 1933 seminar on active imagination, Jung described the symbolism he saw in the imagery:The original cards of the Tarot consist of the ordinary cards, the king, the queen, the knight, the ace, etc., only the figures are somewhat different, and besides, there are twenty-one [additional] cards upon which are symbols, or pictures of symbolical situations. For example, the symbol of the sun, or the symbol of the man hung up by the feet, or the tower struck by lightning, or the wheel of fortune, and so on. Those are sort of archetypal ideas, of a differentiated nature, which mingle with the ordinary constituents of the flow of the unconscious, and therefore it is applicable for an intuitive method that has the purpose of understanding the flow of life, possibly even predicting future events, at all events lending itself to the reading of the conditions of the present moment.

Criticism
Skeptic James Randi once said that:For use as a divinatory device, the tarot deck is dealt out in various patterns and interpreted by a gifted "reader." The fact that the deck is not dealt out into the same pattern fifteen minutes later is rationalized by the occultists by claiming that in that short span of time, a person's fortune can change, too. That would seem to call for rather frequent readings if the system is to be of any use whatsoever.Tarot historian Michael Dummett similarly critiqued occultist uses throughout his various works, remarking that "the history of the esoteric use of Tarot cards is an oscillation between the two poles of vulgar fortune telling and high magic; though the fence between them may have collapsed in places, the story cannot be understood if we fail to discern the difference between the regions it demarcates."  As a historian, Dummett held particular disdain for what he called "the most successful propaganda campaign ever launched", noting that "an entire false history, and false interpretation, of the Tarot pack was concocted by the occultists; and it is all but universally believed."

Some religious groups discourage divination, including tarot card reading. Leviticus 19:26 and Deuteronomy 18:9–12 have been cited as proof texts on this subject by Christian writers. Other groups may be accepting of at least some forms of tarot reading.

See also
Minor Arcana (the 56 suit cards)
Major Arcana (the 22 trumps)
Psychic reading
Rider–Waite tarot deck

Notes

References

Bibliography
 Alexander, Skye and Mary Shannon (2019). The Only Tarot Book You'll Ever Need. Avon, MASS: Simon & Schuster.

External links

 List of tarot decks
 Images from the Grand Etteilla Deck
 Images from Lenormand's deck
 Astrological/Qabalistic calendar wheel showing the trumps and divinatory meanings for the suit cards, from the writings of the Hermetic Order of the Golden Dawn group. (Scalable Vector Graphic, Creative Commons Attribution).

Tarotology
Hermeticism
Romani culture
Cartomancy